Phtheochroa inopiana, the plain conch, is a species of moth of the family Tortricidae. It is found in China (Beijing, Gansu, Hebei, Heilongjiang, Jilin), Iran, Japan, Mongolia, Russia and most of Europe. It has also been recorded from North America. The habitat consists of damp areas and woodland edges.

The wingspan is 17–22 mm. The forewings are relatively narrow and brownish, quite variable in colour. Adults are sexually dimorphic, the females are plainer than the males. Meyrick describes it - Forewings light ochreous, more or less sprinkled or strigulated with brownish, sometimes reddish-tinged; sometimes two darker dots in disc beyond middle. Hindwings pale fuscous. The larva ochreous-whitish; head and plate of 2 brown.
 
The moths are on wing from June to August in western Europe.

The larvae feed inside the roots of Pulicaria dysenterica. The species overwinters in the larval stage.

References

External links
UK Moths

Moths described in 1811
Phtheochroa